The Harrison Memorial Library is a historic building designed by architect Bernard Maybeck and built by  Michael J. Murphy in 1928. It houses a public library for the city of Carmel-by-the-Sea, California. The library provides books, materials and programs that support the pursuit of education, information, recreation, and culture. It includes documents about the history and development of Carmel and the Monterey Peninsula. The Harrison Memorial Library was named after California Supreme Court Justice Ralph C. Harrison. It was designated as an important commercial building in the city's Downtown Historic District Property Survey, and was recorded with the Department of Parks and Recreation on November 18, 2002.

History

In 1904, the Carmel Library began in a cottage at the southeast corner of Lincoln Street and Sixth Avenue (behind the current library), at the beginning of the library movement. In 1905, it was called the Carmel Library Association, with almost 4,000 volumes.

In 1906, Frank Hubbard Powers and ten people contributed $1 for a Carmel City Library. By 1907, seventy citizens got involved. Carmel's first library was a wooden structure given by the Carmel Development Company. In 1911, the bylaws were amended and it became the Carmel Free Library.

On September 27, 1918, Ella Reid Harrison, announced her plan to donate the land and $20,000  in bonds to the city to build a library in honor of her late husband who died in on July 18, 1918. She commissioned artist Jo Mora to draw up the plans for the new building. On October 12, 1922, after Ella Reid Harrison's death, her estate financed a memorial to her husband, California Supreme Court Justice Ralph Chandler Harrison (1833-1918), for the purpose of establishing a new public library. 

Four years later, in June 1927, the board of trustees of the Harrison Memorial Library started proceedings toward building the library. Her estate included rare books, furniture, and a number of valuable art pieces for the library (over 2,000 items). The new library was designed by California architect Bernard Maybeck in a Spanish Eclectic style and built by  Michael J. Murphy, at a cost of $27,373. 

The Harrison Memorial Library opened on March 31, 1928, in a two-story wood-framed building on the corner of Ocean Avenue and Lincoln Street, Carmel-by-the-Sea, California. In 1935, the Fee Building, also built by Murphy, opened next to the library. A $40,000 modernization was done in 1949 by Robert Jones, and a second remodeling in 1977.

The library contains digital collections from the 1900s to the 2000s, genealogy tools, house & buildings collections, historical maps, searchable newspapers, and oral history interviews with Carmel residents. The digital collection includes photographs illustrating theater performances by the historic Forest Theater of Carmel, which was founded in 1910.

Barnet J. Segal Reading Room

Barnet J. Segal setup the Barnet J. Segal Charitable Trust to distribute his estate for the benefit of Monterey County, California. Dr. Herbert and Elaine Berman of Carmel, executors of the trust, gave a $300,000 donation to the Carmel Public Library Foundation. The Barnet J. Segal Reading Room at the Harrison Memorial Library honors him and was dedicated with a special event on June 4, 1995. 

The room includes a large window with a view of the garden and seating for 18 is available around three tables. There is also a table and chairs in front of a fireplace. Above the fireplace is a sign that says: "Barnet Segal Reading Room."

Harrison Library Park Branch

By 1989, the library expanded to the a second Park Brank Library located at Mission Street and 6th Avenue. The Henry Meade Williams Local History Room, in honor of Henry Meade Williams, preserves collections of manuscripts, personal papers, photographs, and books relating to Carmel's history.  

It serves 14,000 registered users with a collection of 6,000 photographs, 2,000 books and letters, diaries, manusciprts, maps, and scrapbooks. The branch has Local History and Youth Services Departments.

Historic preservation
The city of Carmel has created a Downtown Conservation District plan to protect the historic buildings on Ocean Avenue. The building was recorded with the Department of Parks and Recreation on November 18, 2002. The Harrison Memorial Library meets the selection criteria from criterion 1, as a major cultural institution in Carmel, and one of the first public works projects; and criterion 3, in the area of architecture, as an example of Spanish Eclectic design in a public building, and the only known building in Carmel to be designed by architect Bernard Maybeck.

See also
 Carmel-by-the-Sea, California

References

External links
 
 Official website
 City Of Carmel-By-The-Sea Downtown Conservation District Historic Property Survey
 Researching homes or buildings in Carmel
 Guide to the Carmel Preservation Foundation Collection

1928 establishments in California
Carmel-by-the-Sea, California
Buildings and structures in California
Library buildings completed in 1928
Public libraries in California
Tourist attractions in California
Education in California
Spanish Colonial Revival architecture in California